Kırkağaç is a town and district of Manisa Province in the Aegean region of Turkey. According to the 2000 census, population of the district is 48,303 of which 25,093 live in the town of Kırkağaç.

Features 
Kırkağaç is an agricultural district and known for its variety of melon known as Kırkağaç melon.

Olive, walnut, tobacco and almond cultivation is among the important agricultural activities of Kırkağaç.

There has been a road reconstruction in late 2021. A gas supply came to the city at the same time as to the city of Soma. A clock tower is situated in the center of the city.

History  
From 1867 until 1922, Kırkağaç was part of the Aidin Vilayet of the Ottoman Empire. The Greek writer Elias Venezis, in his book Number 31328, states that Kırkağaç was burned from the Armenian quarter by the "enemy" who left; although this book is a memoir, in later versions the word "enemy" was changed to "Greek".

Notes

References

External links
 District governor's official website 
 Road map of Kırkağaç and environs
 Webshots - Image of Kırkağaç Melon Show
 Buy Kirkagac Melon in the UK

Populated places in Manisa Province
Districts of Manisa Province